Several ships of the German and Austro-Hungarian Navies have been named SMS Greif

, an Austro-Hungarian aviso originally launched in 1857 as the merchant paddle steamer Jupiter
, a German aviso launched in 1886
, an Austro-Hungarian  torpedo boat launched in 1907
, a German auxiliary cruiser during World War I